The  of Kodokan Judo consist of two kata that illustrate the principles behind techniques used in , allowing them to be practiced with maximum efficiency.

The randori-no-kata were developed by Jigoro Kano as a teaching aid when it became apparent that he had too many students to effectively demonstrate throws and grappling techniques in his classes. The kata were developed in five years that followed the establishment of the Kodokan, between 1882 and 1887. They originally consisted of ten techniques each and were expanded to fifteen techniques around 1906.

References  

 Jigoro Kano, Kodokan Judo, Kodansha International.
 Tadao Otaki and F. Draeger, Judo Formal Techniques, Tuttle Martial Arts.

Judo kata